Esteban Jesús Daniel García (born 20 April 1984) is an  Argentine footballer who currently plays for Deportivo Español.

References

External links
 
 
 
 
 

1984 births
Living people
Footballers from Buenos Aires
Argentine footballers
Association football midfielders
Argentine Primera División players
Quilmes Atlético Club footballers
Atlético de Rafaela footballers
Kategoria Superiore players
FK Dinamo Tirana players
Argentine expatriate footballers
Argentine expatriate sportspeople in Albania
Expatriate footballers in Albania